Wynn Everett is an American actress.

Life and career
Everett was born in Atlanta, Georgia. She grew up in Dunwoody and Cumming, Georgia. She attended Forsyth Central High School. Her junior year, she was the lead role in a One Act Competition production of Children Of A Lesser God, where she won Georgia State Best Actress. She won Miss Homecoming before graduating with a Bachelor of Arts in Communication and a minor in Theatre from Auburn University in 2000. She is an alumna of Alpha Gamma Delta International Fraternity.

Everett has made appearances on television in House of Lies, Supernatural, Grey's Anatomy, The Event, The Mentalist, Outlaw and the TNT pilot Bird Dog. She has had roles in Root (2004), End of the Spear (2006), as well as playing one of Charlie Wilson's office staff in Charlie Wilson's War (2007). She worked as a green room coordinator on Good Morning America. Everett's poetry has been published in The Curator, Darling Magazine, River Poets Anthology and Wilderness House Literary Review. She appeared as Tamara Hart in the HBO drama series The Newsroom, from 2012 to 2013.

In 2013, Everett was cast as female lead opposite Steve Zahn and Christian Slater in the ABC drama series Mind Games. The series was canceled after five episodes. She later was cast as lead in the TNT drama pilot Lumen.

In 2015, Everett was cast in season 2 of the ABC drama Marvel's Agent Carter as Whitney Frost. She later reprised the role in Avengers Assemble, where the character was originally a Hydra scientist.

She is featured in The Richards Group's Southeastern Conference “It Just Means More” advertising campaign which debuted on September 1, 2016.

In 2020, Everett played Ellen Johnson, the beloved guidance counsellor of Willingham Academy in the sole season of the Netflix series Teenage Bounty Hunters. In 2021, Everett was cast in season 3 of Doom Patrol as Shelley Byron.

Filmography

Film

Television

References

External links
 

American film actresses
American television actresses
Living people
Actresses from Atlanta
Auburn University alumni
21st-century American actresses
People from Cumming, Georgia
People from Dunwoody, Georgia
Year of birth missing (living people)